L'Étoile du Nord is a 1982 French film directed by Pierre Granier-Deferre and based on a novel by Georges Simenon, starring Simone Signoret, Philippe Noiret, Fanny Cottençon and Julie Jézéquel. It won a César Award for Best Adaptation and Best Supporting Actress, and was nominated for Best Actress, Most Promising Actress and Best Editing.

Plot 
On a ship in the 1930s sailing from Alexandria to Marseille, Édouard Binet, a French adventurer, meets Nemrod Loktum, a shady Egyptian businessman, and Sylvie Baron, a Belgian exotic dancer. Nemrod takes the Étoile du Nord train to Brussels, on which he is robbed and killed. Édouard then takes a room at the boarding house in Charleroi of Madame Baron, Sylvie's mother, with bloodstained clothes and a lot of money that he hides. Despite the suspicions of her younger daughter Antoinette and the other lodgers, the frosty Madame Baron is gradually charmed by the suave Frenchman and believes his stories. The police learn of his presence and, after trial, he is sent to the infamous Île de Ré for transportation to the penal colonies. Madame Baron is among the grieving relatives who wave goodbye.

Cast 
Simone Signoret as Mme Louise Baron
Philippe Noiret as Edouard Binet
Fanny Cottençon as Sylvie Baron
Julie Jézéquel as Antoinette Baron
Liliana Gerace as Jasmina
Gamil Ratib as Nemrod Lobetoum
Jean-Yves Chatelais as Valesco
Jean Dautremay as L'ingénieur
Pierre Forget as Albert
Jean-Pierre Klein as Moïse

References

External links 

1982 films
1980s psychological thriller films
Films about amnesia
Films based on Belgian novels
Films based on works by Georges Simenon
Films directed by Pierre Granier-Deferre
Films set in the 1930s
Films set in Belgium
French psychological thriller films
Films with screenplays by Jean Aurenche
Films scored by Philippe Sarde
1980s French-language films
1980s French films